Lake Kovada National Park, established on November 3, 1970, is a national park in southern Turkey. It is located in the Sütçüler-Eğirdir districts of Isparta Province.

Gallery

References

National parks of Turkey
Kovada
Geography of Isparta Province
Landforms of Isparta Province
Tourist attractions in Isparta Province
1970 establishments in Turkey
Protected areas established in 1970